Hugo Haas (19 February 1901 – 1 December 1968) was a Czech film actor, director and writer. He appeared in more than 60 films between 1926 and 1962, as well as directing 20 films between 1933 and 1962.

Life and career
 
Haas was born in Brno, Austria-Hungary (now in the Czech Republic), and died in Vienna, Austria from complications of asthma. He and his brother, Pavel Haas, studied voice at the Brno Conservatory under composer Leoš Janáček. Pavel Haas went on to become a noted composer himself before he was killed in Auschwitz in 1944.

Czechoslovak theater and film
After graduating from the conservatory in 1920, Hugo Haas began acting at the National Theater in Brno, in Ostrava and in Olomouc. In 1924 he moved to Prague and regularly appeared at the Vinohrady Theatre, where he remained until 1929. In 1930, Karel Hugo Hilar made Hugo Haas a member of the Prague National Theatre drama company, where he remained until his emigration in 1939. One of his most highly acclaimed roles was as Doctor Galén in The White Disease, which Karel Čapek had written especially for him. His final role at the National Theater was as Director Busman in Čapek's R.U.R.

Haas made his film debut as Notary Voborský in the silent film Jedenácté přikázání (The Eleventh Commandment) in 1923. (Twelve years later he played the same role again in Jedenácté přikázání directed by Martin Frič.) With the advent of sound film, Haas was able to apply his comedic talent in Svatopluk Innemann's Muži v offsidu in 1931. By 1938 Haas had acted in some thirty films.

In 1936 he directed his first film, Camel Through the Eye of a Needle (co-directed with Otakar Vávra). He later directed Kvočna (the film score was composed by his brother Pavel), The White Disease and Co se šeptá. His final comedy in Czechoslovakia was Miroslav Cikán's Andula Won, which appeared in cinemas in 1938.

Emigration
Following the 1938 Munich Agreement and the German occupation of Czechoslovakia in early 1939, Hugo Haas was dismissed from the National Theater due to his Jewish origin. In April he and his wife, Maria von Bibikoff ("Bibi"), fled via Paris, Spain, and then from the port of Lisbon, Portugal, to the port of New York in October–November 1940. Their son, Ivan, was taken in by his brother Pavel. Hugo Haas' father Lipmann (Zikmund) Haas and brother Pavel died at Nazi concentration camps during the Holocaust.

United States
By the mid-1940s, Haas had become a character actor in American films. In 1951 he launched a successful if unacclaimed career as a film director in Hollywood with a string of B movie melodramas, usually starring blonde actresses in the role of a predatory mantrap. Haas usually cast himself as the male lead in the films although the female role almost always dominated the storyline and was usually exclusively promoted on film posters.  His work also includes a touching human drama, The Girl on the Bridge (1951) – which he co-wrote, directed and starred in – about a kindly watchmaker who after having lost his wife and family in the Holocaust, befriends, marries, and raises a second family with a young woman he saves from suicide.

Cleo Moore starred in six films for Haas, becoming a well-known film star in that era. Other actresses who starred in Haas' films were Beverly Michaels and Carol Morris. The Haas pictures generally received poor reviews but were for the most part commercially successful, and on occasion featured such well-known names as Eleanor Parker, John Agar, Vince Edwards, Joan Blondell, Agnes Moorehead, Julie London, Corinne Griffith, and Marie Windsor.

Haas's final film, Paradise Alley, was rejected by the major studios and sat unreleased for over three years, finally surfacing in a limited run in 1962.

Production company
Haas's first American film was bankrolled out of his own pocket for $85,000.  The financial success of Pickup lead to the creation of the independent Hugo Haas Productions, which he used to produce 12 of his 14 American films from 1951 to 1959.  Independent studios were not atypical at this time, but Haas' operating procedures were. He financed his own films, and the budgets were minuscule compared to most Hollywood fare. While his films' budgets usually ran from $80,000 to $100,000, the average cost for a Hollywood picture in 1955 was $1,500,000. His ventures were risky; he did not secure distribution deals with larger studios until after the movies were made, sometimes delaying their release for months or even years. While Hollywood studios practiced division of labor, with well defined and distinct roles for workers, Haas was described as a "one-man production team," having financed, produced, written, and directed all of his Hugo Hass productions, and having acted in all but one.

Return to Europe
 
In the late 1950s Haas returned to Europe. After a brief stay in Italy, he settled in Vienna in 1961, where he made occasional appearances on television. Except for a brief visit during the centennial celebrations for the National Theater in Prague in 1963, he never returned to his homeland, until his burial in Brno.

Selected filmography

As director
 Velbloud uchem jehly (1936)
 Děvčata, nedejte se! (1937)
 Kvočna (1937)
 Co se šeptá (1938)
 Skeleton on Horseback (The White Disease) (1937)
 Pickup (1951)
 The Girl on the Bridge (1951)
 Strange Fascination (1952)
 One Girl's Confession (1953)
 Thy Neighbor's Wife (1953)
 Bait (1954)
 The Other Woman (1954)
 Hold Back Tomorrow (1955)
 Edge of Hell (1956)
 Hit and Run (1957)
 Lizzie (1957)
 Night of the Quarter Moon (1958)
 Born to Be Loved (1959)
 Paradise Alley (1962)

As actor

 Jedenácté prikázání (1925) - Jirí Voborský
 From the Czech Mills (1925) - Baron Zachariás Zlámaný
 Kdyz struny lkají (1930) - Host v baru
 The Last Bohemian (1931) - MUDr. Katz
 Muži v offsidu (1931) - Načeradec
  (1931) - Richard Načeradec, businessman
 Kariéra Pavla Camrdy (1931) - Vokoun
 Obrácení Ferdyše Pištory (1932) - Richard Rosenstok, banker
  (1932) - Adam Hejnu, shoemaker
 Madla z cihelny (1933) - Jan Dolanský
 The House in the Suburbs (1933) - Zajícek
 Její lékar (1933) - Pavel Hodura, painter
 Life Is a Dog (1933) - Skladatel Viktor Honzl / Prof. Alfréd Rokos
 Sister Angelika (1933) - Pavel Ryant
 Okénko (1933) - Lecturer Jakub Johánek
 Poslední muž (1934) - Prof. Alois Kohout
 The Little Pet (1934) - Dr. Alois Pech, vezenský knihovník
 Long Live with Dearly Departed (1935) - Petr Suk
 Jedenácté přikázání (1935) - Jiri Vobosky
 Paradise Road (1936) - Tobiás
 The Seamstress (1936) - Francois Lorrain - Parisian fashion king
 Three Men in the Snow (1936) - Továrník Eduard Bárta
 Devcata, nedejte se! (1937) - Prof. Emanuel Pokorný
 Morality Above All Else (1937) - Professor Antonín Karas
 Andula Won (1937) - Pavel Haken
 The White Disease (1937) - Dr. Galen
 Co se šeptá (1938) - Vilém Gregor
 Svět kde se žebrá (1938) - Josef Dostál, beggar-millionaire
 Camel Through the Eye of a Needle (1939) - Žebrák Josef Pešta
 Days of Glory (1944) - Fedor
 Summer Storm (1944) - Anton Urbenin
 Strange Affair (1944) - Domino / Constantine
 Mrs. Parkington (1944) - Balkan King (uncredited)
 The Princess and the Pirate (1944) - Proprietor 'Bucket of Blood'
 Documents secrets (1945) - Morenius
 A Bell for Adano (1945) - Father Pensovecchio
 Jealousy (1945) - Hugo Kral
 Dakota (1945) - Marko Poli
 What Next, Corporal Hargrove? (1945) - Mayor Quidoc
 Two Smart People (1946) - Señor Rodriquez
 Holiday in Mexico (1946) - Angus, Evans' butler
 The Private Affairs of Bel Ami (1947) - Monsieur Walter
 Fiesta (1947) - Maximino Contreras
 Northwest Outpost (1947) - Prince Nickolai Balinin
 The Foxes of Harrow (1947) - Otto Ludenbach
 Merton of the Movies (1947) - Von Strutt - Director
 My Girl Tisa (1948) - Tescu
 Casbah (1948) - Omar
 For the Love of Mary (1948) - Gustav Heindel
 The Fighting Kentuckian (1949) - Gen. Paul De Marchand
 King Solomon's Mines (1950) - Van Brun aka Smith
 Vendetta (1950) - Brando - a Bandit
 Pickup (1951) - Jan Horak
 The Girl on the Bridge (1951) - David
 Strange Fascination (1952) - Paul Marvan
 One Girl's Confession (1953) - Dragomie Damitrof
 Thy Neighbor's Wife (1953) - Town Judge Raphael Vojnar
 Bait (1954) - Marko
 The Other Woman (1954) - Walter Darman
 Edge of Hell (1956)- Valentine
 Hit and Run (1957) - Gus Hilmer / Twin Brother
 Lizzie (1957) - Walter Brenner
 Born to Be Loved (1959) - Prof. Brauner
 Bonanza (1960, TV Series) - Zirko
 Paradise Alley (1962) - Mr. Agnus

References

External links

 Hugo Haas, "The Power of Self-Preservation"
 Milain Hain, "Hugo Haas, Trauma, and Survivor Guilt"
 Milain Hain, "Hugo Haas, Forgotten Emigre"

1901 births
1968 deaths
Actors from Brno
People from the Margraviate of Moravia
Jewish Czech actors
Czech male film actors
Czech film directors
20th-century Czech male actors
Expatriate male actors in the United States
Czechoslovak expatriates in the United States
Deaths from asthma
Film people from Brno
Brno Conservatory alumni